Lewis and Clark collectively refers to Meriwether Lewis and William Clark, leaders of the Lewis and Clark Expedition, the first expedition to cross the western portion of the United States.

Lewis and Clark or Lewis & Clark may also refer to:

Places
 Lewis and Clark Caverns, limestone caverns and associated sites in Montana
 Lewis and Clark County, Montana, originally named Edgerton County
 Lewis and Clark Lake, a reservoir on the border of Nebraska and South Dakota
 Lewis and Clark National Forest, in central Montana
 Lewis and Clark National Historic Trail, a trail from Illinois to Oregon
 Lewis and Clark Trail, alternate name of the National Historic Trail
 Lewis and Clark National Historical Park, a collection of state and federal sites near Astoria, Oregon
 Lewis and Clark River, a river in northwest Oregon
 Lewis and Clark State Historic Site, a historic site in Hartford, Illinois
 Lewis and Clark State Recreation Site, a state park near Troutdale, Oregon

Schools
 Lewis & Clark College, a private college in Portland, Oregon
 Lewis & Clark Law School, that institution's private law school
 Lewis and Clark Community College, in Godfrey, Illinois
 Lewis and Clark High School, in Spokane, Washington
 Lewis–Clark State College, a public college in Lewiston, Idaho

Other uses
 Lewis & Clark (elm cultivar), trade name Prairie Expedition
 Lewis & Clark Council, a Boy Scouts of America group in Illinois
 Lewis & Clark (TV series), a short-lived NBC series
 Lewis & Clark: The Journey of the Corps of Discovery, a 1997 documentary film by Ken Burns
 Lewis and Clark (sculpture), a 1934 sculpture by Leo Friedlander
 Lewis and Clark Centennial Exposition, a 1905 exposition in Portland, Oregon
 USNS Lewis and Clark (T-AKE-1), a support ship of the US Navy
 Lewis and Clark-class dry cargo ship

See also

 Lewis and Clark Bridge (disambiguation)
 Lewis and Clark Highway (disambiguation)
 Lewis Clark (disambiguation)
 Eldece Clarke-Lewis (born 1965), Bahamian sprinter
 Lewis v. Clarke, a 2017 U.S. Supreme Court case about tribal sovereignty
 Lewis & Clarke, the nom-de-plume of musician Lou Rogai
 Lois & Clark: The New Adventures of Superman, a 1990s Superman television series
 Luis and Clark, a line of carbon-fiber stringed instruments
 
 
 Lewis (disambiguation)
 Clark (disambiguation)